Daniil Chyorny (c. 1360–1430) was a Russian monk and icon painter.

Career
Together with his companion Andrei Rublev and other painters, Chyorny worked at the Dormition Cathedral in Vladimir (1408) and Trinity Cathedral in the Trinity Lavra of St. Sergius (1420s). Some icons for these cathedrals are believed to have been painted by Chyorny.

Works
The icons of the Assumption Cathedral are currently displayed at the Tretyakov Gallery in Moscow and the Russian Museum in Saint Petersburg.

Veneration 

 12/13 June – feast day, Synaxis of All of Andronikov Monastery (with Andronicus, Sabbas, Alexander, Abbots of Moscow and Andrei Rublev, the icon painter)
 6 July – Synaxis of All Saints of Radonezh
 Synaxis of all saints of Moscow – movable holiday on the Sunday before 26 August (ROC)

References

1360 births
1430 deaths
Russian icon painters
14th-century painters
15th-century painters
14th-century Russian people
15th-century Russian people
Medieval Russian artists
Medieval Russian painters
Eastern Orthodox saints